The American Music Award for New Artist of the Year has been awarded since 2004. Years reflect the year during which the awards were presented, for works released in the previous year (until 2003 onward, when awards were handed out on November of the same year). Previous names of the award include Favorite Breakthrough Artist (2004) and Breakthrough Artist (2005–2010).

Winners and nominees

2000s

2010s

2020s

See also
 American Music Award for Favorite Pop/Rock New Artist (1989-2003 (January))
 American Music Award for Favorite Soul/R&B New Artist (1989-2003 (January))
 American Music Award for Favorite Country New Artist (1989-2003 (January))
 American Music Award for Favorite Dance New Artist (1990-1992)
 American Music Award for Favorite Heavy Metal/Hard Rock New Artist (1990-1993)
 American Music Award for Favorite Rap/Hip-Hop New Artist (1990-1994)
 American Music Award for Favorite Adult Contemporary New Artist (1992-1994)

References

American Music Awards
Music awards for breakthrough artist
Awards established in 2004